Soalandy is a suburb and a rural commune in Analamanga Region, in the  Central Highlands of Madagascar. It belongs to the district of Antananarivo-Atsimondrano and its populations numbers to 11,719 in 2018.

References

Populated places in Analamanga